Bruce A. and June L. Elmore Lustron House is a historic home located at Asheville, Buncombe County, North Carolina.  It was built in 1949, and is a one-story, side-gable-roof Westchester Deluxe two- bedroom-model Lustron house. It is sheathed in dove grey and green enamel-finish steel panels. An addition was made to the house about 1985.

It was listed on the National Register of Historic Places in 2013.

References

Houses on the National Register of Historic Places in North Carolina
Lustron houses
Houses completed in 1949
Houses in Buncombe County, North Carolina
National Register of Historic Places in Buncombe County, North Carolina